The Ashby Road ground was a cricket stadium in the town of Hinckley, Leicestershire, England. It operated between 1911 and 1937. It is now a housing estate.

Ashby Road had been used by Leicestershire as an out-ground, and held 19 games. The first game took place in 1911 against Warwickshire and the last in 1937 against Worcestershire.

References

Cricket grounds in Leicestershire
1911 establishments in England
1937 disestablishments in England
Sports venues completed in 1911
Hinckley